Bhim Singh may refer to:

 Bhim Singh of Amber (died 1537), ruler of the kingdom of Amber
 Bhim Singh Rana (1707–1756), ruler of the princely state of Gohad
 Bhim Singh of Marwar (died 1803)
 Bhim Singh of Mewar (1768–1828), of Mewar Kingdom and the 1st Maharana of the Princely state of Udaipur
 Bhim Singh II (1909–1991), last ruling Maharaja of the princely state of Kotah
 Bhim Singh (politician) (born 1937), Indian politician, activist and author
 Bhim Singh (athlete) (born 1945), Indian former high jumper
 Bhim Singh (wrestler), Indian freestyle wrestler

See also 
 Bhim (disambiguation)